René Vannes (1888 Lille, France–1956 Brussels) was a Belgian musicologist and author of a standard history of lutenists, which is also used as a standard reference work on violin bow makes and archetiers.

Selected works 
Universal Dictionary of Luthiers
 Essai d'un dictionnaire universel des luthiers, Marne (1932) 
 Dictionnaire universel des luthiers, revised Vol. 1, Brussels (1951) 
 Dictionnaire universel des luthiers, revised Vol. 2, Brussels (1959) 
 Dictionnaire universel des luthiers, 2 volumes in 1: 1951 & 1959, Brussels (1979)  
 Dictionnaire universel des luthiers, revised 2nd edition (two volumes) (1986) 
 Dictionnaire universel des luthiers, (two volumes) Brussels 1988 
Other books
 Essai de terminologie musicale ou dictionnaire universel, Paris: Max Eschig 
 Une pianiste alsacienne, Marie de Moroguès-Kiené, Paris 1927, Colmar
 Dictionnaire des musiciens Belges (compositeurs) du XIV au XX siècle (Dictionary of Musicians and Composers, Belgium, 14th Century to the 20th Century), Brussels: Larcier (1947)

See also 
 :Category:Lutherie reference books

References

Belgian musicologists
People from Lille
1888 births
1956 deaths
20th-century musicologists
French emigrants to Belgium